Camellocossus abyssinica is a moth in the family Cossidae. It is found in Ethiopia, Mauritania and Yemen.

References

Natural History Museum Lepidoptera generic names catalog

Cossinae
Moths described in 1910
Moths of Africa
Moths of the Middle East